The Cancer Journal: The Journal of Principles & Practice of Oncology is a bimonthly peer-reviewed medical journal covering oncology. It was established in 1995 as The Cancer Journal from Scientific American by Scientific American, but is now published by Lippincott Williams & Wilkins under the new name since 2000. The editors-in-chief are Vincent T. DeVita (Yale Cancer Center), Theodore S. Lawrence (University of Michigan), and Steven Rosenberg (National Cancer Institute). According to the Journal Citation Reports, the journal has a 2020 impact factor of 3.36, ranking it 58th out of 196 journals in the category "Oncology".

References

External links
 

Oncology journals
Lippincott Williams & Wilkins academic journals
Publications established in 1995
Bimonthly journals
English-language journals